WLGE is an Adult Album Alternative formatted broadcast radio station licensed to Baileys Harbor, Wisconsin, serving Central and Northern Door County, Wisconsin.  WLGE is owned and operated by Case Communications, LLC.

Translator
In addition to the main station, WLGE is relayed by an FM translator to widen its broadcast area.

References

External links
 FM106.9 The Lodge Online
 

2008 establishments in Wisconsin
Adult standards radio stations in the United States
Radio stations established in 2008
LGE
Door County, Wisconsin